Patrick Augustine Feehan (August 28, 1829 – July 12, 1902), was an Irish-born American prelate of the Roman Catholic Church.  He served as the first archbishop of the newly elevated Archdiocese of Chicago in Illinois between 1880 and his death in 1902.  He previously served as bishop of the Diocese of Nashville in Tennessee from 1865 to 1880.

Biography

Early life 
Patrick Feehan was born in Killenaule, County Tipperary, in Ireland, to Patrick and Judith Cooney Feehan. His father was a gentleman farmer. At age ten, Feehan was sent to live with his paternal grandfather to attend school in Fethard. He returned to Killenaullee two years later when a school opened there, and at age 14 started studying Gaelic. In 1845, Feehan entered Castleknock College in Dublin as an ecclesiastic student, where he befriended the future statesman Charles Russell. In January 1847, Feehan started his studies at St Patrick's College in Maynooth, Ireland, where he spent five years.

Archbishop Peter Kenrick of the Archdiocese of St. Louis in the United States had opened a seminary in Carondelet, Missouri. Himself a graduate of Maynooth, Kenrick requested that the college transfer Feehan, on track to become a professor, to his archdiocese. In 1852, Feehan left for the United States; his family had emigrated there two years earlier.

Priesthood 
Feehan was ordained for the Archdiocese of St. Louis by Archbishop Kendrick on November 1, 1852, and assigned to teach at the diocesan seminary. In July 1853 he was assigned to St. John's Parish in St. Louis, where during a cholera epidemic he tended the sick and blessed the dead. The following year, he became president of the Theological Seminary in Carondelet. In 1858, Feehan was appointed pastor of St. Michael's Parish in St. Louis.  Then in 1859, he became pastor of Immaculate Conception Parish, where he established the Society of Saint Vincent de Paul to aid the poor. 

During the American Civil War, the Sisters of Charity were put in charge of a hospital in St. Louis, where Feehan spent long hours comforting the sick and wounded. After the Battle of Shiloh in Tennessee in April 1862, boatloads of wounded soldiers docked in St. Louis. For three days in succession, Feehan moved along the wharf and the stretchers laid in rows on the street, administering last rites to those who would not make it to hospital.

Bishop of Nashville
Feehan was appointed bishop of the Diocese of Nashville by Pope Pius IX on June 7, 1865.  He was consecrated bishop by Archbishop Kendrick on November 12, 1865. During the summer and fall of 1866 he worked to relieve the suffering of those suffering from an outbreak of cholera. In October 1866, he took part in the Second Plenary Council of Baltimore.

The diocese was hard hit by bank closures and the depression of 1873. To help his parishioners, Feehan encouraged a group of men to create a fraternal organization that would be known as Catholic Knights of America.In 1877 and 1878, the diocese suffered yellow fever outbreaks, resulting in the deaths of 13 religious sisters and nine priests, including the vicar-general.

Archbishop of Chicago
On September 10, 1880, Feehan was appointed as the first archbishop of the new Archdiocese of Chicago by Pope Leo XIII. From 1880 to 1902, the Catholic population of Chicago nearly quadrupled, to 800,000, largely due to the arrival of immigrants. In adding to the Irish and German communities already established, Polish, Bohemian, French, Lithuanian, Italian, Croatian, Slovak and Dutch Catholics brought their own unique cultural traditions.  Feehan preferred to keep a low profile; relatively few speeches and sermons exist from his 22-year tenure.

Chicago was still feeling the effects of the Great Fire of 1871, which destroyed many of the schools and churches. Feehan accommodated these diverse needs by creating parishes to serve ethnic communities and recruited religious orders from their home countries to staff them. Of the 140 parishes he founded, 52 percent served a particular ethnic community. According to Rev. Martin Zielinski, an associate professor of Catholic history at Mundelein Seminary, the parishes provided a place where immigrants could find familiar fraternal organizations, music, and language. They served as a haven from xenophobia and hostility directed toward immigrants and Catholics. 

Feehan was a strong supporter of Catholic education, and promoted it at the exhibition at the 1893 World's Columbian Exposition in Chicago "Archbishop Feehan believed a strong system of Catholic education would solve the problem of inconsistent religious instruction at home, and unify a rapidly diversifying Catholic America." He also brought the Vincentians to Chicago to start what is now DePaul University.

Epidemics of cholera and yellow fever in Chicago left dozens of orphans. In 1881, Feehan established the St. Vincent Orphan Asylum, and in 1883 St. Mary's Training School for Boys, a trade school for homeless boys, now known as Maryville Academy. This was followed in 1887 with St. Paul's Home for Working Boys, now known as Mercy Home.

Death and legacy 
Patrick Feehan died on July 12, 1902, in Chicago.  The Chicago Tribune praised his "diplomatic handling" of the various ethnic groups in the diocese.

Notes

1829 births
1902 deaths
19th-century Roman Catholic archbishops in the United States
American Roman Catholic clergy of Irish descent
Roman Catholic archbishops of Chicago
Irish emigrants to the United States (before 1923)
Roman Catholic bishops of Nashville
Burials at the Bishop's Mausoleum, Mount Carmel Cemetery (Hillside)
People educated at Castleknock College
Alumni of St Patrick's College, Maynooth
Roman Catholic Archdiocese of St. Louis
20th-century Roman Catholic archbishops in the United States